Guanyin District is a rural, coastal district in western Taoyuan City, Taiwan.  Guanyin is the name of a Buddhist goddess.

History
Guanyin was originally named as Shiguanyin during the Qing Dynasty rule. It was renamed to Guanyin in 1920 during the Japanese rule. After the handover of Taiwan from Japan to the Republic of China in 1945, Guanyin was reestablished as a township of Taoyuan County. On 25 December 2014, it was upgraded to a district named Guanyin District of Taoyuan City.

Geography
 Area: 87.98 km2
 Population: 73,299 people (February 2023)

Guanyin is part of the alluvial fan in Taoyuan City. The coastline is about 15 km at the northern side.

Administrative divisions
Guanyin, Baiyu, Guangxing, Datan, Baosheng, Wuwei, Sanhe, Xinxing, Kengwei, Jinhu, Lanpu, Datong, Daku, Lunping, Fuyuan, Shangda, Xinpo, Guangfu, Tajiao, Baozhang, Caota, Caoxin, Shulin and Fulin Village.

Infrastructure
 Tatan Power Plant

Tourist attractions

 Baishajia Lighthouse
 1213 Baosheng Inn
 Datian Lotus Farm
 Golden Lake Shore
 Kangzhuang Lotus Garden
 Lin's Old Style House
 Longman Bottle Gourd
 Lotus Garden
 Monet's Garden
 Qinglin Farm
 Sanqi Bee Park
 Sun and Green Farm
 Wu Cuo Yang Jia Zhuang
 Xianghao Leisure Farm
 Yifeng Leisure Farm
 Yuanyin Farm

Transportation

Guanyin District is served by Taoyuan Bus.

See also
 Taoyuan City

References

External links

Districts of Taoyuan City